The European Code of Good Administrative Behaviour is a resolution of the European Parliament whose literature is related legislation to the Staff Regulations of the European Communities.

History
The code creation of discussion was born in 1998 on a proposal by Roy Perry , was approved on September 6, 2001, by the European Parliament.

Legal foundation
The code is grounded in Article 41 of the EU Charter of Fundamental Rights.

Legal goal
The code is guided in the generalization of an administrative and ethical awareness that the European civil service should develop in their work within the institutions and bodies of the European Union. Its implementation and supervision rests with the European Ombudsman.

See also
 Charter of Fundamental Rights of the European Union,European Union.
 Staff Regulations of the European Communities

References

External links
 The European Code of Good Administrative Behaviour, at the Ombudsman's official website

European Union